The American Aircraft Penetrator, now referred as the Aerocraft Stealth Star 204 SS, was a gunship helicopter modified from the Bell UH-1B Iroquois with tandem seating for the pilots and a troop-carrying compartment.

Design and development
In 1990, Bell UH-1B Hueys were stripped down to the engine, transmission and tail boom. A complete armored composite structure was added, the flight controls and seating were modified to a tandem layout, with pilot in front and copilot at the rear. The third and fourth weapons operators were placed in the rear portion of the fuselage firing weapons to the rear. The outer fuselage mounts stub wings, two glazed gun turrets/observation windows under each side of the engine with rear-facing 20mm gun turret under the fuselage, and two forward-facing 12.7mm turrets under the cockpit. The prototype (N3080W ex U.S. Army 63-8508) uses a 1300 shp Avco Lycoming T53-L-13 turboshaft engine and had a gross take-off weight of 4280 kg. First flight was October 1991.

The basic Penetrator is said to be air-to-air, air-to-ground and ground-to-ground combat capable, using modified technologies. It  has been in development and can be seen on Stealthstar.

Specifications

References

 Simpson, R. "Airlife's Helicopter and Rotorcraft", 1998 
 Ruzhitsky, E.I. "Helicopters", 1997

External links
airliners.net
at stealthstar.com

1990s United States attack aircraft
1990s United States helicopters